The Hillside Avenue Historic District is a  historic district located along Hillside Avenue in the city of Plainfield in Union County, New Jersey. It was added to the National Register of Historic Places on June 1, 1982 for its significance in architecture, featuring Colonial Revival architecture. The district includes 33 contributing buildings.

History and description
The houses in this residential district were built in the first quarter of the 20th century. Many feature Colonial Revival architecture. Some houses built earlier have Queen Anne and Second Empire styles. The two and one-half story house at 999 Hillside Avenue was built by architect Alexander Milne in 1907 for William A. Conner. It is a replica of the Longfellow House in Cambridge, Massachusetts.

See also
National Register of Historic Places listings in Union County, New Jersey

References

External links
 

Plainfield, New Jersey	
National Register of Historic Places in Union County, New Jersey
Historic districts on the National Register of Historic Places in New Jersey
Historic districts in Union County, New Jersey
New Jersey Register of Historic Places